Elbert Rufus Hall (May 19, 1882 – January 17, 1935) was an American Negro league first baseman in the 1900s.

A native of Edina, Missouri, Hall attended Northern Illinois University and played for the Cuban X-Giants in 1906. He died in Des Moines, Iowa in 1935 at age 52.

References

External links
Baseball statistics and player information from Baseball-Reference Black Baseball Stats and Seamheads

1882 births
1935 deaths
Cuban X-Giants players
Baseball first basemen
Baseball players from Missouri
People from Edina, Missouri